Ophelia is a 1894 oil on canvas painting by the English painter John William Waterhouse, depicting a character in William Shakespeare's drama Hamlet. She is a young noblewoman of Denmark, a potential wife for Prince Hamlet. In the 1894 version by Waterhouse, Ophelia is depicted, in the last moments before her death, sitting on a willow branch extending out over a pond of lilies. Her royal dress strongly contrasts with her natural surroundings. Waterhouse has placed flowers on her lap and in her hair, tying her into her natural surroundings.

See also
 Ophelia, 1851–52 John Everett Millais painting

References

Portraits of women
1894 paintings
Symbolist paintings
Paintings by John William Waterhouse
Paintings based on works by William Shakespeare